Mahmudabad (also Romanized as Maḩmūdābād; also known as Pīsh Ravābād (Persian: پيش رواباد) and Pīsh Robāţ) is a village in Dizajrud-e Sharqi Rural District, Qaleh Chay District, Ajab Shir County, East Azerbaijan Province, Iran. At the 2006 census, its population was 411, in 108 families.

References 

Populated places in Ajab Shir County